Hands Across the Sea may refer to:

Film
Hands Across the Sea (film), 1912 Australian silent film
Hands Across the Sea (American film), 1912 film starring Dorothy Gibson

Arts and entertainment
Hands Across the Sea (play), short comic play by Noël Coward
Hands Across the Sea (1887 play), by Henry Pettitt

Music
"Hands Across the Sea" (march), an 1899 military march composed by John Philip Sousa
"Hands Across the Sea" (song), 1984 song by British band Modern English
"Hands Across the Sea", 1974 song by British-Australian singer Olivia Newton-John from Long Live Love
"Hands Across the Sea", 1958 song by British singer Shirley Bassey, B-side to the single "As I Love You"
"Hands Across the Sea", 1974 song by British band the Dooleys